The foreign policy and war aims of the Nazis have been the subject of debate among historians. The Nazis governed Germany between 1933 and 1945.  There has been disagreement over whether Adolf Hitler aimed solely at European expansion and domination, or whether he planned for a long-term global empire.

Continentalists vs. globalists

Moltman and Hillgruber
The argument for what these aims meant in literal terms originates from the 1960s by historians Gunter Moltman and Andreas Hillgruber who, in their respective works, claim that it was Hitler's dream to create ‘Eutopia’ and eventually challenge the United States. This thesis puts these two historians in the ‘Globalists’ category, with opposition labelled ‘Continentalists’. Evidence for these claims comes from Germany's preparation for war in the years 1933–39 with increased interest in naval building, and Hitler's decision to declare war on the U.S. after the attack on Pearl Harbor, which shows Hitler's determination. The Globalists use this as an argument for how Hitler's ideology was shaped; i.e., the U.S. could only be defeated if Germany conquered Europe and allied with Britain. It is said with general agreement that this viewpoint expressed by Hitler was written with the mindset that the U.S. was of little interest to Germany, and did not pose a threat to her existence. However, noted through speeches and recorded conversations, after 1930, Hitler viewed the United States as a "mongrel state", incapable of unleashing war and competing economically with Germany due to the extreme effects of the Great Depression. Even in the late 1930s, as Continentalists argue against world conquest, Hitler seems to still disregard the US's power in the world, and believes that only through German-American citizens can the U.S. revive and prosper. This may shed light as to why Hitler made the decision to declare war on the United States after Pearl Harbor, and continued to focus on European expansion in the late 1930s.

However, while Hildebrand believes Hitler had a carefully premeditated Stufenplan (step-by-step) for Lebensraum, Hillgruber claims he intended intercontinental conquest afterwards.  Likewise, Noakes and Pridham believe that taking Mein Kampf and the Zweites Buch together, Hitler had a five-stage plan; rearmament and Rhineland re-militarisation, Austria, Czechoslovakia  and Poland to become German satellites, defeat France or neutralise her through a British alliance, Lebensraum in Russia and finally world domination. Goda agrees, believing that his ultimate aim was the defeat and overthrow of the United States, against whose threat he would guarantee the British Empire in return for a free hand to pursue Lebensraum in the East.  Hitler had long-term plans for French North Africa and in 1941 began to prepare a base for a transatlantic attack on the United States.  Donald Cameron Watt, who in 1990 believed that Hitler had no long-term plans, now agrees with Goda and believes that Hitler refused to make concessions to Spanish and Italian leaders Francisco Franco and Benito Mussolini in order to conciliate a defeated France so that such preparations could proceed.

Jochen Thies
There are other arguments for the case of the Globalists; Jochen Thies has been noted to say that plans for world domination can be seen in Hitler's ideology of displaying power. The creation of magnificent buildings and the use of propaganda to demonstrate German strength, along with the message to create a Reich to last a thousand years, clearly show Hitler's aspirations for the future. Although this seems a weak argument to make; clearly these messages are a result of Nazi Ideology intent on creating followers and boosting morale, what stems from this is the idea of ‘global character’ in reference to war. There is no doubt that Hitler dreamed about the future of his Homeland, and in preparations for war, must have thought about the consequences of victory over the USSR. His struggle, as he would reference in his book Mein Kampf, would and eventually did take on a global character, as he found his country fighting wars on many fronts across the world. The Globalist mindset for Hitler's foreign policy can be supported by the spiraling events of World War II, along with his second book and the debatable meaning of Lebensraum; although the Continentalists can use Lebensraum as evidence to counter.

Fritz Fischer
Fritz Fischer, a continentalist historian who has done extensive work on German history, claims in his book From Kaiserreich to Third Reich: Elements of Continuity in German History, 1871-1945 that foreign policy was just a continuous trend from Otto von Bismarck’s imperialistic policies; that Hitler wanted an empire to protect German interests at a time of economic instability and pressure from competing global empires.

Other views

Martin Broszat
Martin Broszat, a functionalist historian, has been noted many times to point towards an ideological foreign policy fuelled by antisemitism, anti-communism and Lebensraum. He says that Hitler acted towards these three ideals to inspire popularity in his regime and to carry on the amazing transformation he ignited upon coming to power. In relation to foreign policy, this meant the destruction of the Treaty of Versailles and the reuniting of German territories lost after World War I, along with the eradication of Jews and communists around the world. He provides evidence with preparations made in 1938 to take land in the East of Europe, which fits in with the ideology of colonization, economic independency, and the creation of the Third Reich. Broszat offers a Continentalist case in declaring that Hitler was still dreaming of Eutopia when he did not include Poland in his plans before 1939, and focused upon Czechoslovakia and Austria instead; easily attainable territories. Broszat argues against world conquest in this respect, and notes that the escalating ideological radicalism of the Nazis' anti-Semitic views prevented them from being able to launch a truly serious attempt to take over the world. Germany found itself unwillingly in a world war, not a European one.

A. J. P. Taylor
In 1961, A. J. P. Taylor produced a book entitled The Origins of the Second World War, which paints a completely different picture of how Nazi foreign policy was shaped and executed. Taylor's thesis was that Hitler was not the demoniacal figure of popular imagination but in foreign affairs a normal German leader, and compared the foreign policy of the Weimar Republic to that of Hitler, i.e., wanting the destruction of the Treaty of Versailles and wanting her former territories back but by peaceful means, not aggressive. His argument was that Hitler wished to make Germany the strongest power in Europe but he did not want or plan war. The outbreak of war in 1939 was an unfortunate accident caused by mistakes on everyone's part. In addition, Taylor portrayed Hitler as a grasping opportunist with no beliefs other than the pursuit of power and to rid himself of the Jewish question. He argued that Hitler did not possess any sort of long-term plan and his foreign policy was one of drift and seizing chances as they offered themselves. He assigns blame on the harsh restrictions of Versailles, which created animosity amongst Germans, and when Hitler preached of a greater Germany, the public believed in his words and was ready to accept. Taylor's point on this debate sparked uproar and widespread rebuttal, but the whole argument on the nature of Nazi foreign policy was created from his work.

See also
 Geopolitik
Functionalism versus intentionalism
Bottom-up approach of the Holocaust
Auschwitz bombing debate
Historiography of Germany
Historikerstreit
Sonderweg
Vergangenheitsbewältigung
Victim theory, a theory that Austria was a victim of Nazism following the Anschluss

References

Historiography of Nazi Germany
Germany in World War II
Historiography of World War II
Foreign relations of Nazi Germany
Historical controversies
Foreign policy of Nazi Germany